Limbatochlamys rosthorni is a moth of the family Geometridae first described by Walter Rothschild in 1894. It is found in China (Shaanxi, Gansu, Shanghai, Jiangsu, Zhejiang, Hubei, Jiangxi, Hunan, Fujian, Guangxi, Sichuan, Chongqing, Guizhou and Yunnan).

The length of the forewings is 28–37 mm for males and 38 mm for females. The forewings are olive green, the costal area with a greyish-yellow band, speckled with black, and in some areas with greyish red. The hindwings are greyish yellow, the basal area of the hind margin and the outer marginal area with some greyish green, dotted with black.

References

Moths described in 1894
Pseudoterpnini